Canton, New York, is the name of two places in St. Lawrence County, New York. 

Canton (town), New York
Canton (village), New York, in the town